The men's club throw at the 2012 IPC Athletics European Championships was held at Stadskanaal Stadium from 24–28 July.

Medalists
Results given by IPC Athletics.

Results

F32

F51

See also
List of IPC world records in athletics

References

Club throw
Club throw at the World Para Athletics European Championships